Ping Wang may refer to:

Pingwang (disambiguation), a list of places
Wang Ping (disambiguation), a list of people with the surname Wang
King Ping (disambiguation), also known as Ping Wang

See also
Bing Wang (disambiguation), the pinyin equivalent of "Ping Wang" in Wade-Giles